X Factor is a Polish television music competition to find new singing talent and part of a British franchise The X Factor. The third series began on 23 February 2013 and ended on 26 May 2013. All three judges known from the previous series including Czesław Mozil, Tatiana Okupnik and Kuba Wojewódzki returned. On 21 November 2012 it was announced that Jarosław Kuźniar would not be back to present the series due to personal reasons and his commitments to TVN24. On 13 December 2012, Patricia Kazadi was confirmed as the new presenter.  It was reported that Marcin Prokop, Szymon Majewski and Agnieszka Szulim had also been in running for the role.

The winner of the series was Klaudia Gawor, who received a recording contract with label Sony Music Poland, 100,000 PLN and a car funded by Sokołów, sponsor of the show. It was also revealed that MTV would produce her debut music video.

Selection process

Auditions
The pre-auditions began on 1 December in Wrocław and ended on 15 December 2012 in Warsaw.  These were followed by judges' auditions held in Zabrze on 9–11 January 2013 and 23–25 January 2013.

Bootcamp
Bootcamp stage of the competition took place at the Polish Theatre in Warsaw on 5–6 February 2013. On the first day acts divided into groups gave performances in front of the judges. Each act sang a part of song, they had chosen. Selection of songs included: "Livin' on a Prayer" by Bon Jovi, "Next To Me" by Emeli Sande, "Imagine" by John Lennon, Kelly Clarkson's "Stronger (What Doesn't Kill You)", "Are You Gonna Go My Way" by Lenny Kravitz, "What Makes You Beautiful" by One Direction, "Wherever You Will Go" by The Calling, "Drive By" by Train and Whitney Houston's "I Have Nothing".

At the end of the day judges chose forty acts, who got through to the second day of Botcamp. Each of them had to choose one song out of two given and prepare their solo performance overnight. After seeing all performances, the judges made the decision and selected fifteen acts, five in each category, who got through to the Judges' houses stage of the competition.

At the end of Bootcamp each judge received the category they would be mentoring. Wojewódzki was given the 16-24s, Mozil got the Over 25s and Okupnik was asked to look after the Groups.

The fifteen chosen acts were:
16-24s - Klaudia Gawor, Maja Hyży, Diana John, Marta Ławska, Filip Mettler 
Over 25s - Olga Barej, Wojciech Ezzat, Grzegorz Hyży, Zofia Szulakowska, Piotr 'Elton' Waśkowski
Groups - Aicha and Asteya, Daddy's Prides, Girls On Fire, Kasia and Ewa, The Voices

Judges' houses 
The Judges' houses stage was filmed in various locations in the country throughout March 2013. Tatiana Okupnik was joined by musician and producer Radzimir Dębski, who helped her to choose her final three acts. Czesław Mozil was aided by musician known from YouTube CeZik, while Kuba Wojewódzki invited Katarzyna Nosowska.

The six eliminated acts were:
 16-24s: Diana John, Marta Ławska
 Over-25s: Zofia Szulakowska, Piotr 'Elton' Waśkowski
 Groups: Daddy's Prides, Kasia and Ewa

Contestants
The contestants were announced during the episode broadcast on 6 April 2013.

Key:
 – Winner
 – Runner up
 – Third Place

Live shows

Results summary
Contestants' colour key:
{|
|-
| – Czesław Mozil's contestants (over 25s)
|-
| – Kuba Wojewódzki's contestants (16–24s)
|-
| – Tatiana Okupnik's contestants (groups)
|}

Live show details

Week 1 (13 April)
Theme: Number-one singles
Musical guests: Dawid Podsiadło ("Nieznajomy") and M. Pokora featuring Patricia Kazadi ("Wanna Feel You Now") 

Judges' votes to save 
 Wojewódzki: Aicha and Asteya
 Mozil: The Voices
 Okupnik: Aicha and Asteya

Week 2 (20 April)
Theme: Rock

Judges' votes to save 
Okupnik: Aicha and Asteya - thought Barej's final showdown performance was better than her first performance, but backed her own act, Aicha and Asteya
Mozil: Olga Barej - said Barej sang better in the final showdown performance, effectively backing his own act, Olga Barej
Wojewódzki: Aicha and Asteya - gave no reason

Week 3 (27 April)
Theme: Disco

Judges' votes to save 
 Wojewódzki: Filip Mettler - thought both acts sang better in the final showdown performance than before, but backed his own act, Filip Mettler
 Okupnik: Girls On Fire - said she was disappointed Girls On Fire were in bottom two, effectively backing her own act, Girls On Fire
 Mozil: Girls On Fire - praised Mettler's confidence in the final showdown performance, but stated it was not enough and backed Girls On Fire

Week 4 (4 May)
Theme: Songs by Queen or Michael Jackson
Group performances: "Somebody to Love" and "Heal the world"

Judges' votes to save 
Mozil: Girls On Fire - thought Aicha and Asteya don't work as a duo and backed Girls On Fire
Wojewódzki: Aicha and Asteya - praised Girls on Fire for their final showdown performance, though decided to back Aicha and Asteya
Okupnik: Girls On Fire - gave no reason

Week 5 (11 May)
Theme: Pop songs; Polish songs

Judges' votes to save 
Wojewódzki: Maja Hyży - backed his own act
Okupnik: Girls On Fire - backed her own act
Mozil: Maja Hyży - thought Hyży had better connection with audience

Week 6: Semi-final (18 May)
Theme: Soul; Big Band

Judges' votes to save 
Wojewódzki: Maja Hyży - stated his vote was not against Grzegorz Hyży, but had to back his own act, Maja Hyży
Mozil: Grzegorz Hyży - backed his own act
Okupnik: Grzegorz Hyży - thought there were some weaknesses in Maja Hyży's performances and decided to back Grzegorz Hyży

Week 7: Final (26 May)
Theme: Favourite performance; winner's single; celebrity duets 
Group performance: "One Way or Another (Teenage Kicks)" (all finalists)

Winner
On 26 May 2013 in the final episode of the series Klaudia Gawor was crowned the winner.

Klaudia Gawor (born 1995) is a singer from Kraków. She has been singing for five years, after her primary school music teacher encouraged her to take vocal lessons. She graduated from a two-year vocal-acting school. In 2011 Gawor won „Talenty Małopolski 2011” competition and „Festiwal Małych Form Teatralnych”. Now she is taking classical vocal lessons. Since 2011 she is a member of Kraków Gospel Choir. Her favourite music genres are jazz, soul and 60's blues.

Ratings

References

X Factor (Polish TV series)
2013 Polish television seasons
Poland 03